The Gin or Jing people (Yale: Gīng juhk; Vietnamese: người Kinh tại Trung Quốc) are a community of descendants of ethnic Vietnamese people living in China. They mainly live on an area called the Jing Islands (京族三岛) off the coast of Dongxing, Fangchenggang, in the Chinese autonomous region of Guangxi. These territories were administered by the Nguyễn dynasty, but were later ceded by the French to the Qing dynasty due to the convention 1887 of Sino-French war.

Prior to 1958, the Việt were labelled as Yue with the Cantonese groups (Vietnamese: người Việt tại Trung Quốc), before the name "Kinh", "Gin" or "Jing" was used to classify Vietnamese ethnic group separately. 

The Gin population was 33,112 as of 2020. This number does not include the 36,205 Vietnamese nationals studying or working in Mainland China recorded by the 2010 national population census.

Terminology 
In Vietnamese, Kinh and Việt are used interchangeably to refer Vietnamese people, with Kinh used more in more official contexts; the Chinese characters for the ethnic group, 京 and 越, are the same as in Sino-Vietnamese. Kinh (京), meaning "capital city", evolved to refer to people living in the lowlands, to distinguish them from people living in the highlands. Việt (越) is a reference to the Baiyue, a collection of non-Han peoples who lived in southern China since ancient times.

History 
The ancestors of the Gin people immigrated to the area from Hải Phòng, Vietnam, during the 16th century and established communities on the three originally uninhabited islands of Wutou, Wanwei and Shanxin. 
 
During the Mạc dynasty (1533-1592), the land south of Shidawanshan Mountains were ceded to the Ming dynasty. Jiangping was a melting pot of Vietnamese and Chinese, however, the region was neglected by the Vietnamese government. During the 18th and 19th, the area became a hotbed of piracy (see: Pirates of the South China Coast). After the end of the Sino-French War in 1885, Jiangping, Bailong Peninsula and the Jing Islands were ceded by the French to Qing China.

Geography 
The people of this very small ethnic minority have lived for about 500 years on the three islands of Wanwei (Vạn Vĩ), Wutou (Vu Đầu) and Shanxin (Sơn Tâm) off the coast of Guangxi, China, about 8 km east of the border with Vietnam. Some also live in nearby villages of Zhushan and Tanji. 
In the 1960s, the islands were connected to the mainland by a land reclamation project.
The islands are administered as part of Dongxing county within Fangchenggang prefecture.
A minority also live in nearby counties and towns with predominately Han Chinese or Zhuang populations.

The Gin live in a subtropical area with plenty of rainfall and rich mineral resources. The Gulf of Tonkin to its south is an ideal fishing ground. Of the more than 700 species of fish found there, over 200 are of great economic value and high yields. Pearls, sea horses and sea otters which grow in abundance are prized for their medicinal value. Seawater from the Gulf of Tonkin is good for salt making. The main crops there are rice, sweet potato, peanut, taro and millet, and sub-tropical fruits like papaya, banana, and longan are also plentiful. The large tracts of mangroves growing in marshy land along the coast are a rich source of tannin, an essential raw material for the tanning industry.

Language 
The language of the Gin people is a dialect of Vietnamese. The Gin can communicate verbally with Kinh people, but do not use Latin-script chữ Quốc ngữ. Standard Cantonese is also spoken by many in the community as well as Mandarin Chinese.  A survey in 1980 indicated that one third of Gin people had lost their native language and can only speak Cantonese or Mandarin, and another third who are bilingual in the Gin language and Han Chinese languages.  The survey suggested a decline in the use of the Gin language, but in the 2000s, there appeared to be a revival in the use of the language.

For writing, the Gin still use chữ Hán (Chinese characters) and chữ Nôm in Vietnamese, because they were not affected by the transition to the Vietnamese Latin alphabet by the French colonial government during the French colonial period. Created on the basis of the script of the Han people towards the end of the 13th century, it is found in old song books and religious scriptures.

Culture 
 
Gin people like antiphonal songs which are melodious and lyrical. Their traditional instruments include the two-stringed fiddle, flute, drum, gong and the single-stringed fiddle, a unique musical instrument of the ethnic group. Folk stories and legends abound. Their favorite dances feature lanterns, fancy colored sticks, embroidery and dragons.
 
Gin costume is simple and practical. Traditionally, women wear tight-fitting, collarless short blouses buttoned in front plus a diamond-shaped top apron and broad black or brown trousers. When going out, they would put on a light colored gown with narrow sleeves. They also like earrings. Men wear long jackets reaching down to the knees and girdles. Now most people dress themselves like their Han neighbors though a few elderly women retain their tradition and a few young women coil their hair and dye their teeth black.

Many Gin are believers of Buddhism or Taoism, with a few followers of Catholicism. They also celebrate the Lunar New Year, the Pure Brightness Festival, the Dragon Boat Festival, and the Mid-Autumn Festival like the Han.

Fish sauce is a favorite condiment of the Gin people for cooking, and a cake prepared with glutinous rice mixed with sesame is a great delicacy for them. 
There used to be some taboos, such as stepping over a fishing net placed on the beach.

See also
Hoa people
Vietnamese people
Vietnamese people in Hong Kong
Vietnamese people in Taiwan

References

External links 
 The Jing ethnic minority

 
Ethnic groups officially recognized by China
China
China
Guangxi